Hippolyte Vladimirovich Romanov (also spelt Hippolyte Romanoff; ; 1864–1944) was a Russian engineer and inventor, whose work was closely associated with electric vehicles.
He designed the first domestic electric car that was built in Saint Petersburg, 1899.
 
This vehicle was designed to carry two people and became famous under the name "cuckoo."

It has 750 kg weight, of which 370 kg held battery. Capacity of fully charged battery was enough for about 60 km way at a speed of 35 versts per hour (about 39 km/h).

He also built an omnibus car carrying 17 people at a speed of 20 km/h over a distance of 60 km.

His 20-seater electric omnibus designed for hotels was built in the  "Dux" factory in Moscow in 1902 . Its design featured running gear steel tire.

However, the development of electric transport in the country needed support from the state.

On January 19, 1901 Romanov was asked by St. Petersburg City Duma to open 10 routes. 
This required 80 omnibuses, which need  totalling funds of more than 500,000 rubles. 
To find such huge amounts of money, it was decided to establish a joint stock company, which failed, because its direct competitors (different omnibus and tram companies) were clearly unhappy with the new form of transport.

As the result all Romanov's efforts to establish regular traffic of electric buses failed.
Seeing that his ideas were not popular, Romanov transferred to work in other areas of electrical engineering.

He built eight electrical vehicles: 4 trucks, 1 three-cycled van and 3 private passenger cars by mid-1914, according to the magazine "Motorist".
Trying to assess the prospects for the spread of electric cars in Russia, magazine wrote:

References

External links
 Automotive in Russia before 1917
 	Romanoff Hippolyte, Michel V Koudriavzeff (SIGNALING DEVICE (odometer with speedometer wth cyclometer) improvement) - US Patent US1564583
 	Hippolyte Romanoff. Single-rail electric overhead railway with suspended vehicle US Patent US843418 .

 

 

1864 births
1944 deaths
Russian mechanical engineers
Russian electrical engineers
Russian inventors